"The Knife" is a song by progressive rock band Genesis from their second album, Trespass (1970).

Composition
The song was unusually aggressive for Genesis at the time, as most of their work consisted of soft, pastoral acoustic textures and poetic lyrics. It features a bouncy, march-like organ riff, heavily distorted guitars and bass, and fast drumming. (Peter Gabriel said he wanted to write something that had the excitement of "Rondo" by the Nice, and the song's working title was "Nice".) In the lyrics of the song, Gabriel, influenced by a book on Gandhi, "wanted to try [to] show how all violent revolutions inevitably end up with a dictator in power". Gabriel's flute solo gave the song a peaceful interlude amid the aggressive rock elements. The song is in the key of A minor, a difficult key on the flute, so in concert Gabriel would pull the two pieces of his flute apart slightly to lower its pitch by a semitone, then transpose the fingering up a semitone to A minor. Tony Banks tried to remind Gabriel to adjust the flute before each performance, but occasionally the flute solo was performed in the wrong key.

The song features an interlude in which a group of soldiers are confronted by a crowd of protesters chanting "freedom" and attempt to disperse them by "[firing] over their heads," only to massacre the protesters instead. This portion was inspired by the Kent State shootings from the previous spring.

The cover artwork for the single features (clockwise from top left) Gabriel, Phil Collins, Rutherford, Banks and Steve Hackett. Collins and Hackett did not perform on the track but joined the group shortly after the album was recorded, replacing John Mayhew and Anthony Phillips, respectively.

It later appeared on the 2004 compilation album Platinum Collection and the single edit is found on the expanded version of Turn It On Again: The Hits, subtitled The Tour Edition. In March 2014, Steve Hackett added the song on the playlist on the extended tour of his Genesis Revisited II album. The song also appears on the R-Kive box set released on 22 September 2014 in the UK and 29 September worldwide.

Live performances
As the final song in their set, the song was performed often in the band's first five years (a live version appears on the Genesis Live album from 1973) and appeared sporadically in the band's concerts through 1982. The first half of the song was released as a single in May 1971 with the second half as the B-side, but it did not chart. The heavy, progressive rock style of the song was a marked change from previous Genesis songs; it showed the band pioneering a new direction.

The song was the last encore played at the Six of the Best one-off reunion concert in 1982, making this the final song the "classic" line-up of the band ever performed together.

Personnel
Tony Banks – Hammond organ, vocals
Peter Gabriel – lead vocals, flute, percussion
John Mayhew – drums, backing vocals
Anthony Phillips – guitar, backing vocals
Mike Rutherford – bass

References 

Genesis (band) songs
1970 songs
1971 singles
Songs written by Peter Gabriel
Songs written by Tony Banks (musician)
Song recordings produced by John Anthony (record producer)
Songs written by Anthony Phillips
Songs written by Mike Rutherford